The Bad Seed Returns is an American made-for-television horror drama film directed by Louise Archambault, written by Ross Burge, Mckenna Grace, and Barbara Marshall, and starring Mckenna Grace, Michelle Morgan, Benjamin Ayres, Marlowe Zimmerman, Jude Wilson, Gabriela Bee, Ella Dixon, Marlee Walchuk, Lorne Cardinal, and a special appearance by Patty McCormack. It is the sequel to the 2018 television film The Bad Seed, which was both a remake of the 1956 film, as well as having been adapted from William March's 1954 novel. The film premiered on Lifetime on September 5, 2022.

Summary
  
Six years after her father David's death, Emma Grossman (Mckenna Grace) is a sophomore in high school, living with her aunt Angela, Angela's new husband Robert, and their infant son Cade. She is still unsuspected for the murders she committed and masks her psychopathy with the façade of a normal 15-year-old whose life consists of school, friends, and dance.

The opening sequence shows a flash forward of Emma abducting and killing a dog with a knife while newspaper headlines about Emma's past murders flash across the screen.

A time jump takes us to three weeks prior to the events of the end of this film. Emma is struggling to adjust to Angela's new husband Robert living in the house. During breakfast, Emma mentions dance team captain elections are coming up soon, and she expects to beat out her friend Steph for the spot. Robert mentions that his camping knife is missing.

When Angela drops Emma off at school, Emma finds a pamphlet for a boarding school called St. Crispin's and learns Robert wants to send her away. She goes into Abraham High School and meets up with Steph and their other friend, Lola. Later that day, a new girl named Kat joins their physics class. She and Emma exchange unfriendly looks.

At dance practice, Steph is praised by their coach while Emma is told she needs to work more on the routine. She stays after to practice solo. On her walk home, a classmate of hers, Nathan, offers her a ride, but she declines.

Once she's home, Emma tries to lure Cade into the unfenced pool. Angela saves him at the last second and blames Robert for not keeping a closer eye on the child. The food Robert made for dinner is too salty, so Emma suggests they order Chinese instead. Robert is suspicious of her.

The next day, Steph suggests they invite Kat to sit with them in the cafeteria. Emma does so, but Kat is standoffish and declines. Meanwhile, Robert finds his knife in one of Emma's dresser drawers. By the time she arrives home from school, he's arranged for her to go to St. Crispin's her junior and senior year. Emma has a meltdown in her room, then later goes into Cade's room and observes Robert out in the garage through Cade's window.

That night, Emma wakes from dreams of flashbacks of the events of the first film.

The next day, Kat sits with Emma's friend group in the cafeteria and reveals she transferred from St. Aldin's, piquing Emma's suspicion. Steph invites Kat to the dance team's slumber party at her house the following night. Emma once again ruins dinner, prompting a tiff between her and Robert.

Emma has an online therapy session with Dr. March where she vents about Robert wanting to send her away. Dr. March's advice is that she solve the problem she created for herself, so Emma makes amends with Robert and pretends she's on board with going to St. Crispin's. However, when she leaves for Steph's sleepover that night, she causes a car to fall on Robert and whistles as she exits.

At Steph's sleepover, Kat brings weed, and the group starts a game of Never Have I Ever. Kat uses this opportunity to bait Emma, but Steph's mom Rachel interrupts to take Emma to the hospital as Robert has been injured. Emma comforts her aunt and takes care of things around the house. She also takes back Robert's knife. Nathan calls to check on her, and Emma googles what to do when a boy likes you. Meanwhile, Angela visits Robert in the hospital who wakes up and writes, "Emma?" on a piece of notebook paper.

The night before dance team captain elections, Emma sets out to kidnap Steph's dog. Here we see the scene from the beginning of the film. The next day at school, Steph stays home as her dog was found brutally murdered. However, the dance team votes that she should still be able to run for captain, and she beats Emma out anyway. Emma goes home in a bad mood that only worsens when she learns Robert is coming home in a week and she has an interview with St. Crispin's that weekend. Emma has another meltdown in her bedroom.

One week later, Robert comes home in a wheelchair and with an in-home aide, Cora, to take care of him. Emma asks Robert if he remembers what happened during his accident and he says he doesn't. Emma also brings him Cade's baby monitor.

At school, Emma and Kat have a confrontation in the hallway that ends with Kat slapping Emma across the face. Kat gets detention and Nathan escorts Emma to the nurse's office. While there, Emma uses a key to steal the seizure medication kept at the school for Steph. That night, Emma tells Angela that Kat has been bullying her. Angela promises to call the school first thing in the morning to put an end to this.

The next day, Rachel sends Angela the Ring camera footage of the person who abducted Steph's dog. Angela realizes the abductor is Emma, but before she can tell Rachel, Rachel tells her something happened at the high school: Steph had a seizure (triggered by Emma who then covered her tracks so it looked random). Steph's medication is missing, and she is taken to the hospital, but she dies. Angela confronts Emma that night who swears she didn't kill the dog or Steph.

That weekend, Cora is helping Robert get situated outside for some fresh air when she hears a crash. Emma broke into the safe containing Robert's pain pills and stole several, but she stages it to look like a picture frame fell and knocked the safe onto the floor. Emma then sits outside with Robert and pretends to be on the phone with Nathan when Robert asks for her assistance going back inside. He hurts himself, and when Cora comes to wheel him away, Emma whistles to trigger his memory of the night of the accident. After this, Robert and Emma have a confrontation where Robert gives her the ultimatum to go away to St. Crispin's and leave his family alone, otherwise he'll tell the truth and get her sent to jail.

Angela discovers Emma has antisocial personality disorder. Later that night, Emma finds the research Angela was doing on her and takes an online test which tells her she is a psychopath.

The next day, Angela tells Robert she is going out for a couple hours and is taking Cade with her. She meets up with an old Grossman family friend, Brian, to ask about what happened the night he shot her brother David all those years ago. Brian reveals he could never get over a comment David made about Emma: "There's something wrong with her. I need to protect her from herself."

Back at the house, a storm starts up. Emma steals Cora's phone before she heads home for the night, as well as unplugging the landline. Emma screens Angela's calls and invites Kat to come over, promising to tell her everything. Emma then Facetimes Nathan and asks him to come over in about an hour, once she's cleared the air with Kat. When Kat arrives, Emma presents her with a cup of drugged hot chocolate. Emma confesses to Kat who becomes catatonic and can only watch as Emma calls 911 and claims that Kat is attacking her.

Robert wakes up to Cade crying over the baby monitor. He can't find Angela or Emma, so he pushes himself up the stairs. Meanwhile, Emma starts a fire and the smoke alarm goes off. She spills gasoline in the house and frames Kat for the fire. At the same time, Robert arrives in Cade's room and discovers his son is not there; it was only a recording playing from Emma's phone. Emma appears, gloats, and leaves Robert to die.

Angela arrives home and confronts Emma who plays innocent. Angela runs into the burning house to rescue Robert, but the couple dies from smoke inhalation. Emma gets Cade out of Angela's car and puts on a performance for the firefighters when they arrive on scene. Nathan shows up to comfort her as her house explodes.

The final scene shows Emma speaking with a social worker who will be placing her in foster care. Emma requests that she and Cade be kept together. When the social worker exits the room, Emma smiles at the camera.

Cast
 Mckenna Grace as Emma Grossman, a teenage girl who is secretly a murderous psychopath
 Michelle Morgan as Angela Grossman, Emma's aunt and a psychiatrist who has raised her since the death of her brother David. She was previously portrayed by Cara Buono in the first film.
 Benjamin Ayres as Robert Costa, Angela's new husband and Emma's uncle by marriage to her Aunt Angela

 Marlowe Zimmerman as Stephanie, the team captain of the dance team and Emma's classmate and friend who has epilepsy.
 Jude Wilson as Nathan, Emma's friend and love interest
 Gabriela Bee as Lola, Emma's classmate and friend
 Ella Dixon as Kat, Emma's new classmate who knows her past
 Marlee Walchuk as Cora, a home-health nurse who is hired to help Robert
 Lorne Cardinal as Brian, the property caretaker of the Grossmans' lake house who shot David in self-defense
 Patty McCormick as Dr. March, Emma's therapist. McCormick portrayed Rhoda Penmark, the character upon whom Emma is based, in the original version of The Bad Seed; her last name is also a reference to William March, who wrote the novel upon which the film is based.

Production
In November 2021, a sequel to 2018's The Bad Seed was announced with Louise Archambault to direct from a script written by Ross Burge, Mckenna Grace and Barbara Marshall, with Grace reprising her role from the first film. Filming began later that month in Vancouver.

The film was originally scheduled for release on Lifetime on May 30, 2022. On May 25, 2022, the film was delayed to later in the year in light of the Robb Elementary School shooting in Uvalde, Texas. The film ultimately debuted on Lifetime on September 5, 2022.

References

American drama films
Lifetime (TV network) films
Serial killer films
Juvenile delinquency in fiction
2022 horror films
American horror films
2022 films